In finance, unsecured debt refers to any type of debt or general obligation that is not protected by a guarantor, or collateralized by a lien on specific assets of the borrower in the case of a bankruptcy or liquidation or failure to meet the terms for repayment. Unsecured debts are sometimes called signature debt or personal loans. These differ from secured debt such as a mortgage, which is backed by a piece of real estate.

In the event of the bankruptcy of the borrower, the unsecured creditors have a general claim on the assets of the borrower after the specific pledged assets have been assigned to the secured creditors. The unsecured creditors usually realize a smaller proportion of their claims than the secured creditors.

In some legal systems, unsecured creditors who are also indebted to the insolvent debtor are able (and, in some jurisdictions, required) to set off the debts, so actually putting the unsecured creditor with a matured liability to the debtor in a pre-preferential position.

Under risk-based pricing, creditors tend to demand extremely high interest rates as a condition of extending unsecured debt. The maximum loss on a properly-collateralized loan is the difference between the fair market value of the collateral and the outstanding debt. Thus, in the context of secured lending, the use of collateral reduces the size of the "bet" taken by the creditor on the debtor's creditworthiness. Without collateral, the creditor stands to lose the entire sum outstanding at the point of default and must boost the interest rate to price in that risk. Hence, although sufficiently high interest rates are considered usurious, unsecured loans would not be made at all without them.

Unsecured loans are often sought out if additional capital is required although existing (but not necessarily all) assets have been pledged to secure prior debt. Secured lenders more often than not include language in the loan agreement that prevents debtor from assuming additional secured loans or pledging any assets to a creditor.

Examples of unsecured debt

Types of unsecured debt 

 Corporate unsecured debt – Since this type of debt assumes a greater amount of risk, corporations that have lower bond ratings (such as BBB) are classified as unsecured debt due to their higher default risk. 
 Personal loan – A personal loan is a loan which can be taken to meet unspecified financial needs. Today personal loan segment has diverted into many specialised loans. It can be taken for various purpose such as a wedding, traveling, paying education fee, medical emergencies or any undefined reason etc. The interest paid on a personal loan is in most cases higher than that payable on secured loans.
 Consumer durable loan –   In the retail sector or e-commerce, a growing number of merchants have embraced point-of-sale financing. It is commonly called consumer finance. On the spot no-cost EMI option is given. Even though, as per the rules and regulations of specific countries, there can never be no cost EMI option. Any lending institute is bound to take interest in some form or the other from you.
 Student loans – This common type of debt is considered unsecured in many countries, because the loan is usually taken by a student (usually from a graduate or undergraduate level) or the student's parent / legal guardian to pay tuition fees for the student. The borrower is usually expected to pay back the loan after completion of the course and securing a job. Due to the obvious uncertainty of the student to be able to find a job after completion of the course (or at times, even finish it), lenders have very strict criteria for this product. The loan is only given after the lender assesses the student's academic record, the type of course the student is wishing to pursue and the quality of the university / institute where the student has secured admission for the aforementioned course, in addition to other standard criteria such as the guarantor's credit history, bank account statements, assets and holdings, etc. However, in rare cases, the borrower (usually a parent / legal guardian) of the student can pledge assets against the loan, thereby making it a secured loan. In recent times, a lot of salaried professionals also take loans to complete part time courses or certifications. In such cases however, the loan is not considered to be a student loan – it is simply categorized as a general personal loan.

National differences

United States 
Failure to make a payment on an unsecured debt may ultimately result in reporting the delinquent debt to a credit reporting agency or legal action. However, a nongovernmental unsecured creditor cannot seize any of your assets without a court judgment in the U.S.

A creditor must file a complaint in state or federal court before a judgment can be made for or against the borrower.

Malaysia
In Malaysia, there are personal loans for the private sector and for the government sector. The personal loan interest rate for the private sector is always higher than the government sector because it is of lower risk for the bank to lend to the government sector. The government will pay the salary of the civil servants through a payroll system known as the Biro Angkasa and the bank will deduct the monthly installment of the loan from the civil servant's salary through this system, before the salary is even released. An example of these loans are cooperative loans.

Interest rates for personal loans in Malaysia are influenced by either one of these factors: loan amount, loan tenure and income of the applicant. In some cases, the bank will take 2 or even 3 of these factors to decide on the appropriate interest rate to be applied to the personal loan. In 2013, the Malaysian Central Bank introduces a new maximum loan tenure of 10 years for personal loan (previous maximum loan tenure was 25 years).

See also
High-yield debt
Guarantor loan
Medical debt
Merchant cash advance
Peer-to-peer lending
Term deposit
Credit card debt

References

Fixed income
Management theory